August Fredrik Ahlstedt (24 April 1839 Turku – 19 August 1901 Pargas) was a Finnish landscape and portrait painter.

Biography

Born in Turku, he studied under Robert Wilhelm Ekman before continuing his studies in Düsseldorf (1869–74). He was one of the first artists to join Victor Westerholm in the artists colony at Önningeby on the island of Åland in 1886. He and his wife Nina Ahlstedt, also a painter, returned there in subsequent years.

Ahlstedt was a prolific painter, creating a wide range of portraits and landscapes. His work is part of permanent collections in Finland and abroad. He participated in exhibitions at the Finnish Artists Exhibitions from 1892 to 1901, as well as in Stockholm (1897) and Paris (1900). A posthumous exhibition was held at the Finnish Artists Exhibition in 1924.

Works

See also
 Finnish art

References

1839 births
1901 deaths
19th-century Finnish painters
People from Turku
Finnish male painters
19th-century Finnish male artists